Patriarch Ignatius IV may refer to:

 Ignatius IV Sarrouf, Melkite Greek Catholic Patriarch of Antioch in 1812
 Ignatius IV of Antioch, Eastern Orthodox Patriarch of Antioch in 1979–2012